Beans (also spelled as I Beans) are an Italian pop music group, mainly successful in the seventies.

Career 
The group formed in  1969 in Catania, Sicily. Under the production of singer-songwriter Gianni Bella, they got a large success with their cover of the 1918 Armando Gill's classic "Come Pioveva", which peaked at the fourth place on the Italian hit parade. 

Following a number of minor hits, in 1978 the group entered the main competition at the Sanremo Music Festival with the song "Soli".  The song named a RAI variety show, hosted by Patrizia Lazzari and Laura Trotter and with the participation of the same group.

Personnel    
     Armando Simola - lead vocalist (1967 - 1969)
     Pier Paolo Cristaldi -  drums (1967 - present)
     Tony Ranno -  bass guitar, voice (1967 - present)
     Salvatore Trovato -  lead vocalist (1969 - 1972)
     Gino Finocchiaro -  keyboards,  voice (1969 - 1979)
     Giuseppe Russo -  guitar (1969 - 1972)
     Pippo Panascì -  guitar, voice (1972 - present)
     Giuseppe Grillo - guitar, voice (1972 - present)
     Franco Morgia - lead vocalist, guitar (1972 - 1979)
     Carmelo Morgia - lead vocalist, guitar (1979 - present)
     Gaetano Coco -  keyboards,  voice (1979 - 1989)
     Alex Magrì -  keyboards,  voicei (1989 - 2003)

Discography  
Albums  
     1975: Come pioveva (CGD, 81176)
     1976: Sto piangendo  (CGD, 81732)
     1978: Soli (CGD, 20037)
     1983: Beans (La Ciminiera, CMR 79003)
     1990: Ancora una volta si può (Sea Musica, ISO 0032) 
     1991: Melo Morgia canta i Beans (DV More Record, DV 1018)
     1998: Stelle (DiscoBoom, CD 10041)
     2001: I Beans cantano Battisti (DiscoBoom, CD 10076)
     2005: I Beans per sempre (DiscoBoom)
     2006: Le più belle canzoni dei Beans (Warner, 5051011-2926-2-0)

References

External links
  
 
 

Musical groups established in 1969
Italian pop music groups
1969 establishments in Italy